The Treaty of Celle was signed on 5 February 1679 (NS) / January 26, 1679 (OS) in Celle.
Sweden acceded to the Treaty of Nijmegen.
In exchange for ceding control of Thedinghausen and Dörverden, its sovereignty over Bremen-Verden was confirmed.

References

1679 treaties
1679 in Europe
Treaties of the Swedish Empire
1679 in Sweden